The 1905–06 Trinity Blue and White's basketball team represented Trinity College (later renamed Duke University) during the 1905–06 men's college basketball season.

Schedule

|-

References

Duke Blue Devils men's basketball seasons
Duke
Duke Blue Devils men's basketball
Duke Blue Devils men's basketball